The 2020 AFL draft consisted of the various periods where the 18 clubs in the Australian Football League (AFL) could trade and recruit players following the completion of the 2020 AFL season.

Due to the impact of the COVID-19 pandemic, the National, Pre-season and Rookie drafts were held as a "virtual event" on 9 and 10 December

Key dates

Previous trades 
Since 2015, clubs have been able to trade future picks in the next year's national draft during the trade period. As a result, a total of 40 selections for the 2020 draft were traded during the 2019 trade period. Further trades of future picks can be made before or during the 2019 national draft. The selection order for each of these picks is tied to the original club's finishing position in the 2020 season.

Free agency

Trades

List changes

Retirements

Delistings

Moved to Rookie List

As part of the revised AFL Collective Bargaining agreement, clubs could now move up to two players from their Senior List on to their Rookie List without having to redraft them through the rookie draft.

Pre-draft selections

As part of their 2019 draft concessions,  were able to prelist players from their Academy zone.

2020 national draft 

 Fremantle are carrying over a 264.9 point deficit from 2019 (Liam Henry, Next Generation Academy selection #9), moving their default first round pick
 Greater Western Sydney are carrying over a 254.2 point deficit from 2019 (Tom Green, Academy selection #10), moving their default second round pick 
 Port Adelaide are carrying over a 115.9 point deficit from 2019 (Jackson Mead, Father–son rule selection #25), moving their default second round pick

Rookie elevations 
Clubs were able to promote any player who was listed on their rookie list in 2020 to their 2021 primary playing list prior to the draft.

2021 pre-season draft

The 2021 pre-season draft was held on the afternoon of Thursday, 10 December 2020 prior to the commencement of the rookie draft.

2021 rookie draft

Category B rookie selections

Pre-season supplemental selection period

See also 
 2020 AFL Women's draft

References

Australian Football League draft
Draft
AFL Draft
2020s in Melbourne
Australian rules football in Victoria (Australia)
Sport in Melbourne
Events in Melbourne
Sports events affected by the COVID-19 pandemic